The Type 212CD class (for Common Design) is a submarine class developed by ThyssenKrupp Marine Systems (TKMS) for the Norwegian and German navies. The class is derived from the Type 212 submarine class, but will be significantly larger than the 212 class.

Project history 
A €5.5 billion contract for development and procurement of the six submarines was placed with TKMS in July 2021 after the German and Norwegian governments reached an agreement in principle in March. This followed an extensive period of negotiation between industry and the two governments which took place after Norway had, in 2017, decided on an extensive naval partnership with Germany and TKMS for their  replacement project. The Ula-class submarines were also built by TKMS/HDW.

In Kiel, a German-Norwegian Building Program Office (BPO) is to be set up and tasked with representing the two states in matters of design, construction and acceptance. Management will alternate between a German and Norwegian representative, with a third of the staff being Norwegian. 

Afterwards, a Lifetime Management Program Office (LMPO) is to be established in Haakonsvern Naval Base. Management will also alternate, with a third of the staff being German. The office is to handle questions concerning maintenance and repairs of the submarines. Norway will establish maintenance facilities for both countries submarines. Construction of the first submarine is planned to begin in 2023.

Characteristics
The submarines will be based on, but nearly twice the size of the current Type 212A class and features a new stealth design - the hull will be diamond-shaped to deflect emissions by the active sonars common on modern anti-submarine warfare (ASW) ships.

Propulsion 
Just like the Type 212A, the submarines will be fitted with a hydrogen fuel cell-based air-independent propulsion system, although they will receive two (MTU 4000 series) diesel engines instead of one. The overall endurance is to be increased as well.

Command and control systems 
A new combat system ("ORCCA") to be developed by kta naval systems, a joint venture between TKMS' naval electronics division Atlas Elektronik and Norwegian manufacturer Kongsberg will be installed on the boats and is claimed to allow the analysis of larger amounts of sensor data as well as to improve interoperability with allied forces. The first batch of German Type 212 submarines already uses the Kongsberg-developed MSI-90U Mk1+ combat system.

Sensors 
Two optronics masts including sensors from Hensoldt (OMS 150 and OMS 300) will be used instead of the hull-penetrating periscope of the previous U212A class for search, surveillance and attack functions. A Hensoldt panoramic surveillance system will be installed while Kongsberg will contribute the active SA9510S MKII Mine Avoidance and Navigation Sonar as well as echo sounders for navigation.

List of boats
The submarines are being procured by the Norwegian Defence Materiel Agency Forsvarsmateriell (four submarines) and the German Armed Forces Procurement Agency BAAINBw (two submarines).

Italics indicate estimated date.

Weapons
The submarines will feature four tubes for DM2A4 heavyweight torpedoes and Germany plans to fit the IDAS air-defense missile to theirs.

See also 
 Type 214 submarine - A class of export-oriented diesel-electric attack-submarines, also developed by ThyssenKrupp Marine Systems and currently operated by the navies of Greece, Portugal, South Korea and Turkey.
 Type 218SG submarine - A class of extensively-customised diesel-electric attack-submarines developed ThyssenKrupp Marine Systems and currently operated by Singapore.
  - A class of extensively-customised diesel-electric attack-submarines developed by ThyssenKrupp Marine Systems and currently operated by Israel.
  - A unique class of  diesel-electric attack-submarines developed by ThyssenKrupp Marine Systems and currently being built for Israel.
  - A class of export-oriented diesel-electric attack-submarines, jointly developed by Naval Group and Navantia and currently operated by the navies of Chile, Malaysia, India and Brazil.
 S-80 Plus submarine - A class of conventionally-powered attack-submarines, currently being built by Navantia for Spain.
  - A class of diesel-electric attack-submarines, built by Mitsubishi Heavy Industries for Japan.
 Type 039A submarine - A class of diesel-electric attack-submarines operated by China and being built for the navies of Thailand and Pakistan.
  - A class of diesel-electric attack-submarines being built for Russia.

References 

 *
Attack submarines
Submarine classes
Submarines of Norway
Submarines of Germany
Ships built in Emden